The 1985 Portuguese Grand Prix was a Formula One motor race held in Estoril on 21 April 1985. It was the second round of the 1985 FIA Formula One World Championship and was won by Ayrton Senna from pole position, taking both his first pole position and win in the process. Senna demonstrated his proficiency in wet racing by finishing the race at least one lap ahead of every car except second-place finisher Michele Alboreto.

Report

Race 
Jonathan Palmer was the first driver to retire and was able to bring his Zakspeed into the pits and retire with suspension problems. Wet weather caused spinouts frequently early in the race. Philippe Alliot retired trackside for this reason on lap 3. François Hesnault retired trackside with an electrical problem on the same lap.

On lap 4, Riccardo Patrese made contact with Stefan Johansson while attempting to pass him on the inside line. Running 10th and 11th at the time, both cars were spun out into a gravel trap by the contact. Patrese was beached, and Johansson was able to rejoin the race after a delay, several positions down. Soon after, Stefan Bellof and Manfred Winkelhock made contact on track; both were able to restart their cars and rejoin the race. Numerous other small offs and spinoffs continued through the wet conditions.

By lap 10, Ayrton Senna had pulled away from 2nd position by almost 13 seconds. Elio de Angelis, Alain Prost, and Michele Alboreto (in order) were closely contending second position, and Derek Warwick was 15 seconds behind them in 5th. Gerhard Berger and Pierluigi Martini both spun off and retired on lap 12. The top four held steady to lap 15, with Niki Lauda and Patrick Tambay in 5th and 6th, 25 seconds behind 4th place Alboreto. Keke Rosberg spun his car on track on lap 16, and it came to rest in the middle of the track, causing a local yellow. Rosberg's car was not immediately cleared and remained on track in the same position for numerous laps.

At 20 laps, Senna had extended his lead on his teammate de Angelis to 30 seconds, with Prost and Alboreto still close behind. The two Renaults of Tambay and Warwick were more than a minute behind Senna in 6th and 7th. Only 9 cars remained on the lead lap. Nelson Piquet pitted repeatedly around lap 25, finally retiring with a tyre issue. Rain, which was already falling at the start of the race, continued and got heavier. Near lap 30, Mauro Baldi spun out and ended on track with damage to his car and leaving a lot of mud on the racing surface, and Alain Prost retired with damage after spinning and striking the rear of his car on the track barrier. Still in the lead, Ayrton Senna signaled to race officials along pit lane asking them to stop the race. The race was not stopped or interrupted, but did continue at an unusually slow pace because of the poor weather conditions.

The 1985 Portuguese Grand Prix was originally scheduled for 70 laps. At the beginning of lap 67, race leader Ayrton Senna was given a "one lap to go" indication from the race director, as the race had exceeded the prescribed two-hour time limit. Senna crossed the line, having led every lap of the race, and with only one other car on the lead lap, that of second-place Michele Alboreto. Patrick Tambay and Elio de Angelis, both one lap down, took third and fourth. Nigel Mansell and Stefan Bellof took the final points-paying positions, two laps down.

Senna's win was his first of two in the 1985 Formula One season, and the first of what would be 41 Formula One Grand Prix victories.

Classification

Qualifying

Source: ChicaneF1.com.

Race

Sources: Formula1.com, GP Archive.

Championship standings after the race

Drivers' Championship standings

Constructors' Championship standings

Note: Only the top five positions are included for both sets of standings.

References

Portuguese Grand Prix
Grand Prix
Portuguese Grand Prix